The Northern Illinois Huskies women's volleyball team is the college volleyball team that represent Northern Illinois University (NIU) in DeKalb, Illinois, United States. The school's team currently competes in the Mid-American Conference (MAC). The Huskies are coached by Ray Gooden.

NIU women's volleyball started playing in 1970 and has appeared in the NCAA tournament seven times (1993, 1996, 1997, 1998, 2001, 2011, 2016), and in the National Invitational Volleyball Championship (NIVC) three times (1991, 1992, 1994).

Season-by-season records

Source: NIU Volleyball Record Book

Division I postseason results

NCAA tournament
The Huskies have appeared in seven NCAA tournaments. Their combined record is 3–7.

National Invitation Championship
The Huskies appeared in three National Invitational Volleyball Championships (NIVC). Their combined record is 8–5.

Coaching staff
NIU volleyball head coach Ray Gooden is a five-time MAC coach of the year, has led the Huskies to three MAC Championships and two NCAA tournament appearances.
Ray Gooden – Head Coach
Yohannehs (Joe) Davidson – Assistant Coach
Morgan Salow – Assistant Coach
Veronica Katarzynski – Director of Operations

Honors

All-Americans
NIU volleyball has had four players named to the AVCA All-America teams.

Academic All-Americans
NIU volleyball has had three players named to CoSIDA academic All-America teams, including one first-team academic All-American selection.

Players of the year
NIU volleyball has had ten players named player of the year by the conference.

Specialists of the year
NIU volleyball has had three players named specialist of the year by the conference.

Coaches of the year
NIU volleyball has had nine head coaches named coach of the Year by the conference.

See also
List of NCAA Division I women's volleyball programs

References

External links